The 69th Primetime Creative Arts Emmy Awards honored the best in artistic and technical achievement in American prime time television programming from June 1, 2016, until May 31, 2017, as chosen by the Academy of Television Arts & Sciences. The awards were presented across two ceremonies on September 9 and September 10, 2017, and was broadcast by FXX on September 16. The nominations were announced on July 13, 2017. The ceremony is in conjunction with the annual Primetime Emmy Awards and is presented in recognition of technical and other similar achievements in American television programming, including guest acting roles.

Winners and nominees
Winners are listed first and highlighted in bold:

Governors Award
 ITVS

Programs

Acting

Animation

Casting

Choreography

Cinematography

Commercial

Costumes

Directing

Hairstyling

Hosting

Interactive Media

Lighting Design / Direction

Main Title Design

Make-up

Motion Design

Music

Picture Editing

Production Design

Sound

Special Visual Effects

Stunt Coordination

Technical Direction

Writing

Wins by network

Programs with multiple awards

Programs with multiple nominations

Notes

References

External links
 Academy of Television Arts and Sciences website

069 Creative Arts
2017 in American television
2017 in Los Angeles
2017 awards in the United States
2017 television awards
September 2017 events in the United States